The Col. Matthew Rogers Building, also known as the Abraham Lincoln Long Nine Museum, is a historic building located at 200 S. Main St. in Athens, Illinois. The building was constructed circa 1832 by Colonel Matthew Rogers, who ran a store in the building. As Rogers was also postmaster of Athens, he moved the city's post office to his store. Abraham Lincoln, who was postmaster of New Salem at the time, frequently visited the post office during the 1830s to fetch mail. Josiah Francis purchased the store on a mortgage from Rogers in 1837. When Rogers sued Francis for failing to keep up with his mortgage payments in 1840, Lincoln again became involved with the store, as his firm represented Rogers in court; Rogers won the case by default. After Rogers died in 1848, the building continued to be used as a store. The building is now a museum documenting Lincoln and the Long Nine's history and connection to the building.

The building was added to the National Register of Historic Places on May 22, 2005.

References

External links
Abraham Lincoln Long Nine Museum website

Commercial buildings on the National Register of Historic Places in Illinois
Greek Revival architecture in Illinois
Commercial buildings completed in 1832
Buildings and structures in Menard County, Illinois
History museums in Illinois
Abraham Lincoln
Museums in Menard County, Illinois
National Register of Historic Places in Menard County, Illinois